The Oxford University Dramatic Society (OUDS) is the principal funding body and provider of theatrical services to the many independent student productions put on by students in Oxford, England. Not all student productions at Oxford University are awarded funding from the society. However it is rare, for example, for any student production at the Oxford Playhouse not to receive substantial funding from the society. The society funds many types of shows, mostly at the Oxford Playhouse, Burton Taylor Theatre, and the individual college theatres such as the Moser Theatre at Wadham and the O'Reilly Theatre at Keble. All productions put on by Oxford University students can use the society's services, such as the website, the auditions portal, and advice from the committee, providing their production company is registered.

The Society supports a competition for Freshers (Cuppers), held in Michaelmas Term and a New Writing Festival in Hilary Term.  OUDS also supports an annual National UK Tour, which culminates in a long run at the Edinburgh Festival Fringe. Previously, the society has also facilitated a Shakespeare production, jointly with Thelma Holt, touring Japan, with preview performances in the UK.

The society was founded in 1885 by Alec MacKinnon.

During World War I, when some 200 Belgian refugees came to Oxford, the society lent its room to a 'Belgian Club'.

Alumni 
Many famous actors have participated in OUDS productions. For example, in 1907 professional actresses Lily Brayton and her sister Agnes appeared as Katherine and Bianca in The Taming of the Shrew. John Gielgud made his directing debut at OUDS in 1932 with a production of Romeo and Juliet in which he enlisted professional actresses Peggy Ashcroft to play Juliet and Edith Evans to play the Nurse. Another notable production was when Richard Burton and Elizabeth Taylor appeared in a production of Dr. Faustus in 1966 with undergraduates in the supporting cast.

Past members and people associated with OUDS productions include:

Paul Almond
Lindsay Anderson
Andrew Havill
Gethin Anthony
Pierre Audi
Rowan Atkinson
Helen Atkinson-Wood
Peter Bayley
Timothy Bateson
John Betjeman
Will Bowen
Gyles Brandreth
Richard Burton
Kate Beckinsale
Eve Best
Shirley Catlin
Caryl Churchill
Michael Codron
Alex Cox
Jonathan Cullen
Richard Curtis
Thomas de Mallet Burgess
George Devine
Edith Evans
Felix Felton
Oliver Ford Davies
Philip Franks
Patrick Garland
William Gaskill
John Gielgud
Peter Glenville
Hugh Grant
Tom Hooper
Arthur Hutchinson
David Jessel
Felicity Jones
Peter Kosminsky
Nigel Lawson
Harry Lloyd
John Maud
David Melamed
Ariane Mnouchkine
Dudley Moore
Stanley Myers
Terence O'Brien
Norman Painting
Katherine Parkinson
Roger Parry
Rosamund Pike
Esther Rantzen
Diana Quick*
Gervais Rentoul
Gillian Reynolds*
Tony Richardson
John Schlesinger
Thea Sharrock
Maggie Smith
Mel Smith
Imogen Stubbs
Mabel Terry-Lewis
Kenneth Tynan
 John Veale (incidental music)
Evelyn Waugh
David William
Emlyn Williams
John Wood
Dornford Yates
Owain Yeoman
Michael York

* Note that women could not formally join OUDS until 1963. Diana Quick was the first female OUDS President.

See also 
 Experimental Theatre Club (ETC)
 The Oxford Revue
 University College Players

References

Further reading 
 Carpenter, Humphrey, O.U.D.S.: A Centenary History of the Oxford University Dramatic Society 1885–1985, Oxford University Press, 1985.
 OUDS 125th Anniversary Gala programme, Oxford Playhouse, 13 June 2010.

External links 
 OUDS website

Organizations established in 1885
Dramatic Society
Dramatic Society
Dramatic Society
Student theatre in the United Kingdom
Amateur theatre companies in England
Theatre in Oxford
1885 establishments in England
Arts organizations established in the 1880s